Hadlock can refer to

 Hadlock, Virginia, an unincorporated community
 Hadlock Pond, a man-made reservoir in the state of New York
 Hadlock Field, a minor league baseball field in Portland, Maine
 Ryan Hadlock (born 1978), an American record producer

See also
 Port Hadlock-Irondale, Washington, a census-designated place